Jesse Arthur Younger (April 11, 1893 – June 20, 1967) was a United States representative from California. A member of the Republican Party, he was the first Representative from San Mateo County, California, serving seven terms from 1953 to 1967.

Early life and career 
Born in Albany, Oregon, as an adolescent he moved to Kirkland, Washington, where he attended the public schools. Younger graduated from the University of Washington at Seattle in 1915.

He was drafted during World War I, serving in the Washington National Guard, and then overseas serving with the Forty-eighth Coast Artillery Corps for ten months until June 1919 when he was discharged as a captain.

He was employed at the Seattle Title Trust Co., from 1920 to 1930, where he was a manager, director and vice-president of the mortgage division. He subsequently became president of the Seattle Mortgage Loan Co. from 1930 to 1934.

Congress 
He was elected to Congress in 1952, where he served until his death from leukemia in Washington, D.C. in 1967. He defeated William Keller in 1962 to retain his seat. Younger voted in favor of the Civil Rights Acts of 1957, 1960, and 1964, as well as the 24th Amendment to the U.S. Constitution and the Voting Rights Act of 1965.

Legacy 
A principal thoroughfare in San Mateo County, State Route 92, was named in Younger's honor, as the "J. Arthur Younger Freeway".

See also
 List of United States Congress members who died in office (1950–99)
 U.S. Congressional Delegations from California
 State Route 92

References

External links

1893 births
1967 deaths
San Francisco Bay Area politicians
University of Washington alumni
Washington Huskies athletic directors
People from Albany, Oregon
Deaths from leukemia
American Congregationalists
Republican Party members of the United States House of Representatives from California
20th-century American politicians
Burials at Cypress Lawn Memorial Park